Orange and Blue may refer to:
 Orange and Blue (album), a 1994 jazz album by Al Di Meola
 "The Orange and Blue", a fight song of the Florida Gators
 Orange and Blue, a horse race held at Balmoral Park, Illinois

See also
 Blue (disambiguation)
 Blue Orange (disambiguation)
 Orange (disambiguation)
 Orange–blue coalition, a type of coalition in Belgian politics